Lena Micko (born 18 June 1955, officially Eva-Lena Micko) is a Swedish Social Democratic politician from Umeå. She served the Löfven cabinet as Minister for Public Administration from 2019 to 2021. She succeeded Ardalan Shekarabi.

She has previously served as councillor for Linköping Municipality and she was the Chairperson of the Swedish Association of Local Authorities and Regions between 2015 and 2019.

References 

Living people
1955 births
21st-century Swedish politicians
21st-century Swedish women politicians
Women government ministers of Sweden
Swedish Social Democratic Party politicians
People from Umeå